The Mercedes-Benz SLR McLaren (C199 / R199 / Z199) is a grand tourer jointly developed by German automotive manufacturer Mercedes-Benz and British automobile manufacturer McLaren Automotive and sold from 2003 to 2010. When the car was developed, Mercedes-Benz owned 40 percent of the McLaren Group and the car was produced in conjunction between the two companies.
SLR is an abbreviation for "Sport Leicht Rennsport" (Sport Light Racing), a homage to the Mercedes-Benz 300 SLR which served as the car's inspiration. The car was offered in coupé, roadster and speedster bodystyles with the latter being a limited edition model.

History

At the 1999 North American International Auto Show, Mercedes-Benz presented their Vision SLR concept, inspired both by the Mercedes-Benz 300 SLR Uhlenhaut Coupé of 1955, which was a modified Mercedes-Benz W196S race car, and the design of closed-wheel Formula One cars, a field in which they had prior experience from  Mercedes-Benz competing in Formula One in the past as constructor also winning back to back championships in their debut season 1954 then 1955. Also during the jointly developed project of Mercedes-Benz SLR McLaren in 2003 Mercedes-Benz acquiring 40 percent ownership of McLaren Group competed in Formula One as partnership with the McLaren Formula One Team, and were developing powertrains and electronics for McLaren's Formula One cars. The car was presented as "Tomorrow Silver Arrow" in a clear reference to the Silver Arrows of the golden age of Mercedes in competition during the fifties. Later that year, during the Frankfurt Motor Show, a roadster version of the SLR concept was presented.

Wanting to bring the concept to production following its positive reception, Mercedes joined forces with their Formula One partner, McLaren, thus creating the Mercedes-Benz SLR McLaren. Mercedes did the styling on the car while McLaren was fully responsible for everything else, from the design and the engineering to the manufacture and the testing of each car at the production line. The production version of the car was unveiled to the general public on 17 November 2003 having some major design adjustments in respect of the initial design. In order to give the car the performance that Mercedes wanted, McLaren had to radically alter the concept for better weight distribution, including moving the engine almost a meter back and lowering the fuel tank. Smaller adjustments included more complex vents on both sides of the car, a redesigned front with the three pointed star plunged in the nose and red tinted rear lights.

The Mercedes-Benz SLR McLaren saw a production run of over six years. On 4 April 2008, Mercedes announced it would discontinue the SLR. The last of the coupés rolled off the production line at the end of 2010 and the roadster version was dropped in early 2009.
Due to the automatic gear box, front mid-engine arrangement, and its driving characteristics, some automotive journalists classify the SLR McLaren as a grand tourer.

Technical highlights

Brakes

The SLR features Sensotronic Brake Control, a type of brake-by-wire system. The brake discs are carbon-ceramic units and provide better stopping power and fade resistance than steel discs when operating under ideal working temperature. The front discs are internally vented and measure  in diameter; eight-piston callipers are used. During wet conditions the callipers automatically skim the surface of the discs to keep them dry.

Aerodynamics

The SLR features active aerodynamics; there is a spoiler mounted on the rear integral air brake flap. The spoiler increases downforce depending on its angle of elevation (angle of attack). At a set speed, the spoiler/brake automatically raises to 10 degrees (15 degrees in the 722 edition), when demanded via the driver's switch, the elevation can be increased to 30 degrees (35 degrees in the 722 edition) for increased rear downforce, at the cost of increased steady state drag. The car has a flat underbody and a rear diffuser for improved downforce. Due to this, there was no other place for the exhaust pipes to exit, other than the sides of the car, making it another unique feature of the SLR.

Engine

The engine is lubricated via a dry sump system. The Lysholm-type twin-screw supercharger rotates at a maximum of 23,000 rpm and produces  of boost. The compressed air is then cooled via two intercoolers.

McLaren took the original concept car designed by Mercedes and moved the engine  behind the front bumper, around  behind the front axle. They also optimised the design of the centre firewall.

Transmission

The SLR uses the AMG SPEEDSHIFT R five-speed automatic transmission with three manual modes. For durability, Mercedes selected a five-speed transmission rather than their seven-speed transmission which was more complex and used more parts.

Performance
The car uses carbon-fibre reinforced plastic (CFRP) construction in an attempt to keep the weight low.

Car and Driver also achieved top gear acceleration  and  times of 1.7 and 2.4 seconds, which are the fastest ever recorded by the magazine in a production car. The SLR also pulled 0.97 g on the skidpad. The magazine suggested that the times may be even lower if temperatures were lower.

 Motor Trend tested the SLR and achieved a 0- acceleration time of 3.3 seconds in April 2006. 

Road And Track tested the car in their July 2005 Road Test and reached  from a standstill in 3.5 seconds.

Variants

722 Edition

A new version of the SLR was introduced in 2006, called the Mercedes-Benz SLR McLaren 722 Edition. The "722" refers to the victory by Stirling Moss and his co-driver Denis Jenkinson in a Mercedes-Benz 300 SLR with the starting number 722 (indicating a start time of 7:22 a.m.) at the Mille Miglia in 1955.

Larger  diameter front brakes and a revised front air dam and rear diffuser were fitted.

Other exterior changes include red "722" badging, harking back to the original 722 racer, black tinted tail lights and headlamps. The interior has carbon fibre trim and black leather upholstery combined with Alcantara. 

Production of the 722 Edition was limited to 150 units.

Roadster

A roadster version of the SLR went on sale in September 2007.

However, as a convertible, the roadster was burdened with extra weight, which affected performance and handling. The Roadster's roof is made from a "newly developed material" and does not take the form of a folding metal arrangement, as is common on many modern cars. Following a manual unlatching, it takes ten seconds to fold away electrically. The SLR Roadster was aimed to compete against other luxurious sports cars such as the Pagani Zonda F Roadster.

Roadster 722 S (2009)

The Roadster variant of the 722 Edition was unveiled at the 2007 Frankfurt Motor Show. The roadster has the same engine and suspension setup as the coupé along with the folding roof mechanism shared with the standard SLR roadster.
The model went on sale in January 2009 and production was limited to 150 units.

722 GT (2007)

The 722 GT is a racing version of the SLR 722 which was developed for a one-make racing series called the SLR Club. The cars were built by Ray Mallock Ltd. following requests from enthusiasts with approval from Mercedes-Benz. The car has new wider bodywork to accommodate  OZ racing wheels. The front grill vents are removed and larger, free flowing air extractors sit on the hood and flank the side of the car. The rear now has a fixed racing wing and diffuser.

The car has a modified Eibach racing suspension with a modified stabiliser at the front that improves handling. An adjustable wheel camber along with shock absorbers with variable compression and rebound settings allows the suspension setup to be configured for different race tracks. New 18-inch OZ racing wheels with central locking nuts allow for faster tyre changes while a pneumatic jack system aids further in the process. The stock carbon ceramic braking system has been replaced with an FIA approved racing brake system with steel brake discs having a modified cooling system and balance that ensure improved stopping power. The transmission from the standard car is retained but is now configured for race use.

Inside, the car is stripped out with only the essential functions being available, controlled from a carbon fibre binnacle. The stock steering wheel has been replaced with a racing steering wheel with paddle shifters and a gear change indicator, the heated leather seats have also been removed in favour of Recaro racing bucket seats with six-point racing harness and the gauges have been replaced with a digital racing display. New carbon fibre door panels, plexiglass windows and a full roll cage complete the transformation. Production was limited to just 21 units.

The SLR McLaren 722 GT was available to the North American market exclusively through their dealerships by Renntech.

Stirling Moss (2009)

Named after the British racing driver of the same name, the SLR Stirling Moss is a limited edition variant unveiled at the 2009 North American International Auto Show, which uses a speedster styling that does not include a roof or a windscreen. The car is designed by Korean designer Yoon Il-hun and is inspired by the 300 SLR race car. The interior was designed by Dutch designer Sarkis Benliyan. The SLR Stirling Moss was to be the last series of the McLaren SLR built under the partnership between Mercedes-Benz and McLaren, until McLaren announced their own final Edition of the SLR in late 2010.

The car is approximately  lighter than the regular model due to carbon fibre construction and speedster styling.

The SLR Stirling Moss began production in June 2009, after the SLR Roadster was discontinued in May 2009. All 75 cars planned to be produced were completed by December 2009. The SLR Stirling Moss was available only to the existing SLR owners and each car cost in excess of US$1 million.

McLaren Edition (2011–2013)

In December 2011, more than a year after the SLR was officially discontinued, McLaren Special Operations (MSO) announced a bespoke program for the SLR. The McLaren Edition is based on all variants of the SLR with the exclusion of Stirling Moss and includes revised bodywork (front and rear bumper, grille, top shell, side grills, rear diffuser, wheels) and interior parts, along with upgraded steering and suspension components and a new titanium sports exhaust. The cars were modified exactly to the owner's specifications and due to this no car was similar to the other. The personalisation cost £150,000 and was offered for only 25 cars.

Sales

Total sales were 615 units in 2005, 261 units in 2006, and 275 units in 2007, falling well below Mercedes-McLaren's goal of selling 500 units annually.

When the SLR was first announced, Mercedes said total production would be limited to 3,500 units. 1,400 units had been sold by the end of 2007. The factory confirmed that production would halt at the end of 2010.

A total of 2,157 cars were produced.

Motorsports
Spencer Pumpelly entered an SLR McLaren in the Speed World Challenge GT class, driving for TRG Motorsports.

See also
 Mercedes-Benz W196
 Mercedes-Benz 300SL
 Mercedes-Benz 300 SLR
 Mercedes-Benz SLS AMG

References

Notes

Bibliography

External links

Mercedes SLR AMG Overview
McLaren Mercedes-Benz SLR pages: SLR coupé, SLR Roadster, SLR 722 coupé, Roadster 722 S

SLR McLaren
McLaren vehicles
Grand tourers
Roadsters
Cars introduced in 2003
Hardtop convertibles
Front mid-engine, rear-wheel-drive vehicles